Peter Breen (born October 29, 1969) is an American former competitive ice dancer. With partner Rachel Mayer, he is the 1992 U.S. national silver medalist. They represented the United States at the 1992 Winter Olympics where they placed 15th.

Following that partnership, Breen teamed up with Kate Robinson. They are the 1997 U.S. bronze medalists.

Breen is currently a physical therapist and works with elite figure skaters such as Stephen Carriere and Katrina Hacker.

Results
GP: Champions Series (Grand Prix)

With Mayer

With Robinson

References

External links
 Backstage PT

American male ice dancers
Olympic figure skaters of the United States
Figure skaters at the 1992 Winter Olympics
Living people
1969 births
Sportspeople from Brockton, Massachusetts